Aboubacar Soulama is a former Ivorian rugby union player. He played as a wing.

He played for Burotic Abidjan in Ivory Coast.

Soulama had 4 caps for Ivory Coast, from 1994 to 1995, scoring 1 try, 1 conversion and 2 penalties, 13 points in aggregate. He was called for the 1995 Rugby World Cup, playing in two games and scoring a try in the 54-18 loss to France.

External links
Aboubacar Soulama International Statistics

Living people
Ivorian rugby union players
Rugby union wings
Year of birth missing (living people)